Thomas & Friends is a children's television series about the engines and other characters on the railways of the Island of Sodor, and is based on The Railway Series books written by the Reverend W. Awdry. 

This article lists and details episodes from the twentieth series of the show, which started airing on 5 September 2016 in the UK, and on 21 October 2016 in the US. The series was narrated by Mark Moraghan for audiences in the UK and US. It was notable for being the first series since the show’s fourth to directly adapt stories from the original Railway Series books.

Episodes

Notes

References

2016 American television seasons
2017 American television seasons
Thomas & Friends seasons
2016 British television seasons
2017 British television seasons